Education in Ballarat may be divided into a four groups: pre-school, primary education, secondary education and tertiary education. Ballarat is home to two universities and many primary and secondary schools. Entry to tertiary education for most students is through the Victorian secondary school system where students are ranked by the Australian Tertiary Admission Rank (ATAR) upon completion of Year 12.

Preschool education

Ballarat offers 37 preschool institutions. They are located in the suburbs of Alfredton, Bakery Hill, Ballarat Central, Ballarat East, Ballarat North, Black Hill, Brown Hill, Delcombe, Lake Gardens, Lake Wendouree, Mount Clear, Mount Helen, Mount Pleasant, Redan, Sebastopol, Soldiers Hill and Wendouree, and the townships of Buninyong, Cardigan, Creswick and Miners Rest.

Primary and secondary education
Education in the city is overseen by the Victorian Department of Education and Early Childhood Development (DEECD), whose role is to 'provide policy and planning advice for the delivery of education'.

The City of Ballarat lists 55 primary schools within the district, however many of these schools are not in the city. The primary schools in Blowhard, Bungaree, Buninyong, Cape Clear, Clunes, Creswick, Haddon, Lal Lal, Miners Rest, Napoleons, Ross Creek, Warrenheip and Waubra are all serviced by the Ballarat Council.

The city has ten secondary colleges, consisting of four government, three Catholic and three other non-governmental schools.

Tertiary Education

With two internationally accredited Universities located within Ballarat Federation University Australia (formerly the University of Ballarat) and the Australian Catholic University, Aquinas Campus, the city is well served for all aspects of higher education.

Australian Catholic University, Aquinas Campus
The Campus began in the establishment of the Aquinas Training College by the Ballarat East Sisters of Mercy in 1909. It later became known as Sacred Heart Training College because of its association with Sacred Heart College, now Damascus College.

In the mid-1960s with increasing enrolments and the demands of a growing school population, the College moved to Patrician House in Victoria Street, Ballarat.

In 1973 the property at 1200 Mair Street, until then the Queen's Church of England Girls' Grammar School, was purchased by the Sisters of St John of God, who conduct St John of God Ballarat Hospital. In turn, the property was purchased by the Diocese of Ballarat and became the new site of the Catholic teachers' college, which was initially known as Aquinas College.

Initially the Institute was concerned predominantly with the preparation of primary teachers for Catholic schools, but by 1980 it had accredited courses concerned with post-primary education, nursing, religious education and church music, among others.

In 1990 the Aquinas formally handed responsibility for the Institute and its operations to ACU.

Today, the Ballarat Campus of ACU has around 1000 students, making it the smallest of the city's universities.

Federation University
Federation University has a long history in Ballarat. The product of the amalgamation of the University of Ballarat and the Gippsland Campus of Monash University in 2014, the University has its earliest origins as the Ballarat School of Mines in 1870.

The School of Mines became known as SMB (the School of Mines and Industries, Ballarat) in 1976, which was the governing body of three Ballarat schools; the Ballarat School of Industries, Ballarat Technical School and the Ballarat Institute of Advanced Education. These schools became the University of Ballarat in 1990, incorporating different schools from Ararat, Stawell and Horsham. SMB also controlled Ballarat Junior Technical School and Ballarat Girls' Junior Technical School which formed Mount Clear College.

See also
 Ballarat Associated Schools
 Education in Victoria
 List of universities in Australia
 List of schools in Ballarat
 List of high schools in Victoria

References